The 181st New York State Legislature, consisting of the New York State Senate and the New York State Assembly, met from January 8, 1975, to August 5, 1976, during the first and second years of Hugh Carey's governorship in Albany.

Background
The U.S. Department of Justice found fault with the congressional, senatorial and Assembly districts in Manhattan and Brooklyn under the apportionment of 1971, and ordered a revision to safeguard the rights of minorities. The Legislature enacted an amendment to the 1971 apportionment, remapping the legislative districts in Manhattan and Brooklyn, during a special session on May 29 and 30, 1974. On July 1, the U.S. Department of Justice accepted the revised districts as passed by the Legislature.

Thus, under the provisions of the New York Constitution of 1938 and the U.S. Supreme Court decision to follow the One man, one vote rule, re-apportioned in 1971, and amended in 1974, by the Legislature, 60 Senators and 150 assemblymen were elected in single-seat districts for two-year terms. Senate and Assembly districts consisted of approximately the same number of inhabitants, the area being apportioned without restrictions regarding county boundaries.

At this time there were two major political parties: the Republican Party and the Democratic Party. The Conservative Party, the Liberal Party, the Courage Party, the Free Libertarian Party, the Socialist Workers Party, the Communist Party, the Socialist Labor Party and the Labor Party also nominated tickets.

Elections
The New York state election, 1974, was held on November 5. Congressman Hugh Carey and State Senator Mary Anne Krupsak were elected Governor and Lieutenant Governor, both Democrats. Carey defeated the incumbent Governor Malcolm Wilson. The elections to the other five statewide elective offices resulted in a Republican Attorney General with Liberal endorsement; a Democratic State Comptroller with Liberal endorsement; a Republican U.S. Senator with Liberal endorsement; and two Democratic judges of the Court of Appeals, one of them with Liberal endorsement. The approximate party strength at this election, as expressed by the vote for Governor, was: Democrats/Liberals 3,029,000; Republicans/Conservatives 2,220,000; Courage 12,500; Free Libertarians 10,500; Socialist Workers 9,000; Communists 5,000; Socialist Labor 4,500; and Labor 3,000. Gathering from the results for the other offices, the strength of the Liberals was about 400,000 votes, and the Conservatives about 250,000. However, Conservative Barbara A. Keating polled more than 800,000 votes for U.S. Senator.

Of the seven women members of the previous legislature, State Senator Mary Anne Krupsak (Dem.), a lawyer of Amsterdam, was elected Lieutenant Governor of New York, and became ex officio President of the State Senate; and five of the other six—State Senators Karen Burstein, a lawyer of Lawrence, and Carol Bellamy, a lawyer of Brooklyn; and Assemblywomen Elizabeth Connelly (Dem.), of Staten Island; Estella B. Diggs, of the Bronx; and Rosemary R. Gunning (Cons.), a lawyer of Ridgewood, Queens—were re-elected. Linda Winikow, of Spring Valley, was also elected to the State Senate. Jean Amatucci (Dem.), a registered nurse of White Lake; Mary B. Goodhue (Rep.), a lawyer of Mount Kisco; and Marie M. Runyon (Dem.), of Manhattan, were also elected to the Assembly.

The New York state election, 1975, was held on November 4. No statewide elective offices were up for election. One vacancy was filled in the Legislature: Jeannette Gadson, of Brooklyn, was elected to the Assembly.

On February 10, 1976, Gerdi E. Lipschutz (Dem.), of Queens, was elected to fill a vacancy in the Assembly, making her the eleventh woman member of the Legislature of 1976, surpassing the previous record of eight in the 166th New York State Legislature (1947–1948).

Sessions
The Legislature met for the first regular session (the 198th) at the State Capitol in Albany on January 8, 1975; and adjourned sine die in the morning of July 12.

Stanley Steingut (Dem.) was elected Speaker.

Warren M. Anderson (Rep.) was re-elected Temporary President of the State Senate.

The Legislature met for a special session at the State Capitol in Albany on September 4, 1975; and adjourned sine die in the early morning of September 9. This session was called to take measures concerning the financial crisis of New York City.

The Legislature met for another special session at the State Capitol in Albany on November 13, 1975. On November 25, a help package worth $200 million was enacted to avert the financial breakdown of New York City. They adjourned sine die on December 20, after enacting an increase of $600 million in state taxes.

The Legislature met for the second regular session (the 199th) at the State Capitol in Albany on January 7, 1976; and adjourned sine die in the morning of June 30.

The Legislature met for yet another special session at the State Capitol in Albany on August 4, 1976; and adjourned sine die on the next day. This session was called to consider Governor Carey's proposed court reform.

State Senate

Senators
The asterisk (*) denotes members of the previous Legislature who continued in office as members of this Legislature. Franz S. Leichter changed from the Assembly to the Senate at the beginning of the session. Assemblyman Anthony V. Gazzara was elected to fill a vacancy in the Senate.

Note: For brevity, the chairmanships omit the words "...the Committee on (the)..."

Employees
 Secretary: Albert J. Abrams, resigned 1976
 Roger C. Thompson, in 1976

State Assembly

Assemblymen
The asterisk (*) denotes members of the previous Legislature who continued in office as members of this Legislature.

Note: For brevity, the chairmanships omit the words "...the Committee on (the)..."

Employees
 Clerk: Catherine A. Carey

Notes

Sources
 Legislators' Lulu List: Who Gets $$ in the Civil Service Leader (Vol. XXXVI, No. 27, issue of September 30, 1975; pg. 10)
 Democrats Control State Assembly by Betsy Buchner, in The Evening News, of Newburgh, on November 6, 1974

181
1975 in New York (state)
1976 in New York (state)
1975 U.S. legislative sessions
1976 U.S. legislative sessions